Pamela Dutkiewicz (born 28 September 1991) is a German athlete who specialises in hurdling. She qualified for the 2016 Summer Olympics where she finished 4th in her semifinal for the women's 100 m hurdles and did not advance to the final. She won the silver medal at the 2018 European Championships.

She hails from a Polish sports family. Her mother Brygida Brzęczek was an athlete who won 5 medals at the Polish athletics championships in 800 m. Her father Marian Dutkiewicz was a footballer for Olimpia Poznań and a Poland national under-21 football team.

Personal bests

Outdoor

Indoor

References

External links

1991 births
Living people
German female hurdlers
Athletes (track and field) at the 2016 Summer Olympics
Olympic athletes of Germany
German people of Polish descent
Sportspeople from Kassel
World Athletics Championships athletes for Germany
World Athletics Championships medalists